Juzet-d'Izaut (literally Juzet of Izaut) is a commune in the Haute-Garonne department in southwestern France.

It lies on the former Route nationale 618, the "Route of the Pyrenees".

Population

See also 
Communes of the Haute-Garonne department

References 

Communes of Haute-Garonne
Haute-Garonne communes articles needing translation from French Wikipedia